Dead by April is the debut album from Swedish metal band Dead by April, released on 13 May 2009. It is the only album to feature former guitarist Johan Olsson.

The album entered the Swedish album charts at No. 2, with Relapse by Eminem at No. 3 and 21st Century Breakdown by Green Day at No. 1. The first single from the album was "Losing You", released on 6 March 2009. On 18 April the track listing, along with the album cover, was released.

The album mainly consists of re-recorded demo songs, except for two new tracks called "What Can I Say" and "Sorry for Everything". One of the two new tracks, "What Can I Say" was released as the second single from the album on 16 September, and "Angels of Clarity" became the third such release on 28 September. "What Can I Say" was released as a physical single only in Europe and "Angels of Clarity" as a digital download single only in the UK.

Track listing 

Bonus tracks

Bonus DVD
 "Video Blog"
 "The Making Of"
 "Losing You" (Music Video)
 "Losing You" (Karaoke version)
 "Photo Slide" (Live photography)
 "Interview"

Critical reception 

"Fusing huge hooks, infectious melodies, stonking nu-metal styled riffage and electro samples, Dead by April surely know how to write songs... Sure, it won't leave your ears ringing, or fists bleeding, but it'll have you humming all the way home from the show," remarked Katie Parsons of Kerrang!, giving it a 4 out of 5 rating.

Personnel 
Dead by April
 Jimmie Strimmel -  lead vocals
 Pontus Hjelm - guitars, keyboards, programming, backing vocals, additional production
 Johan Olsson - guitars
 Marcus Wesslén - bass guitar
 Alexander Svenningson - drums

Charts

Weekly charts

Year-end charts

References

2009 debut albums
Dead by April albums